Milind Tambe known as Gordon McKay Professor of Computer Science and Director of Center for Research on Computation and Society at Harvard University; he is also the Director "AI for Social Good" at Google Research India.

Career

Fellowships and Awards
Prof. Tambe is a fellow of AAAI (Association for Advancement of Artificial Intelligence), as well as ACM (Association for Computing Machinery). He is also recipient of the IJCAI John McCarthy Award, as well as the ACM SIGART Autonomous Agents Research Award. Additionally, Professor Tambe has been recognized by the AAAI (Association for Advancement of Artificial Intelligence)'s Robert S. Engelmore Memorial Lecture Award and the Christopher Columbus Fellowship Foundation Homeland security award.  He has also received Distinguished Alumnus Award from Birla Institute of Technology and Science (BITS).

Previous Positions

Previous to his position at Harvard and Google, he was Helen N. and Emmett H. Jones Professor in Engineering and a Professor of Computer Science and Industrial and Systems Engineering at the University of Southern California, Los Angeles.

Research
Professor Tambe's work focuses on advancing AI and multiagent systems for public health, conservation and public safety, with a track record of building pioneering AI systems for social impact. His research focuses on fundamental problems in computational game theory, machine learning, automated planning, intelligent agents, and multi-agent interactions that are driven by these topics, ensuring a virtuous cycle of research and real-world applications. This research has led to significant practical impact, such as use of the green security games framework to assist wildlife conservation around the world, use of social networks and machine learning to assist in improving public health outcomes such as HIV prevention, and the use of pioneering security games research for security optimization by agencies such as the US Coast Guard and the Federal Air Marshals Service.

In terms of public safety and security, the security games framework that Professor Tambe pioneered has been deployed and tested for security optimization, both nationally and internationally, by agencies such as the US Coast Guard and the Federal Air Marshals Service. More specifically, Professor Tambe and team provided the first ever applications of computational game theory for operational security. The first of these deployments was the ARMOR system of game theoretic algorithms for security (e.g., counter terrorism) which started operating at the Los Angeles LAX airport in 2007, deployed by the LAX police division,. This work was followed by pioneering deployments of security games for major security agencies such as the Federal Air Marshals Service, the US Coast Guard and the Transportation Security Administration. This research is credited with more than $100 million in savings to US agencies.

In terms of AI for conservation, Professor Tambe and team were the first to apply AI models, specifically machine learning and game theory,  for global scale anti-poaching efforts, as part of the PAWS project for wildlife conservation. The PAWS AI system has been deployed in collaboration with wildlife conservation agencies to assist rangers around the world. PAWS has helped rangers in removing 10s of 1000s of traps used to kill endangered wildlife in national parks in countries such Cambodia and Uganda. Furthermore, PAWS is integrated with the SMART software, making PAWS available for use at 100s of national parks around the globe.

Professor Tambe and his team also provided the first large scale applications of social network algorithms for public health. For example, in a recently completed study with 700 youth experiencing homelessness, Professor Tambe and team's algorithms led to a significant reduction in HIV risk behaviors compared to traditional approaches. Other examples include research in collaboration with NGOs for improving maternal health care outcomes,  TB prevention and others.

Bibliography
 Artificial Intelligence and Social Work (with E. Rice) Artificial Intelligence and Social Work, 2018. Cambridge University Press 
 Security and Game Theory: Algorithms, Deployed Systems, Lessons Learned (1st edition) 2011. Cambridge University Press, 
 Keep the Adversary Guessing: Agent Security by Policy Randomization 2008. VDM Verlag Dr. Mueller e.K.,

References

External links
Home page: Milind Tambe

Fellows of the Association for the Advancement of Artificial Intelligence
Fellows of the Association for Computing Machinery
Living people
American people of Indian descent
Computer scientists
Artificial intelligence researchers
University of Southern California faculty
Carnegie Mellon University alumni
Year of birth missing (living people)